Bobovišća  is a village located near Supetar on the west coast of the island of Brač, off Split, in Croatia. It is connected by the D114 highway. 

It is located on a cove that branches into two ports, Bobovišća na moru and Vičja luka.

References

Populated places in Split-Dalmatia County
Brač